Ranch: The Alan Wood Ranch Project is a Canadian documentary film, directed by Steven DeNure and Chris Lowry and released in 1985. The film profiles Vancouver artist Alan Wood, and his 1983 art project of building a 320-acre replica ranch in Alberta.

The film premiered in October 1985 at the Chicago International Film Festival, and had its Canadian premiere in November at the Art Gallery of Ontario's Jackman Hall.

The film received a Genie Award nomination for Best Feature Length Documentary at the 8th Genie Awards in 1987.

References

External links
 

1985 films
1985 documentary films
Canadian documentary films
Documentary films about visual artists
English-language Canadian films
1980s English-language films
1980s Canadian films